The Florida Interactive Entertainment Academy (FIEA) is a graduate school of the College of Arts and Humanities at the University of Central Florida located in Orlando, Florida, United States. The director of the school is Ben Noel, former vice president and chief operating officer of EA's Orlando-based Tiburon studio.

FIEA is a graduate video game development school offering an accredited master's degree in interactive entertainment. Areas of study include game design, art, programming and production. The Academy is located at UCF's Center For Emerging Media, which also houses other graduate and undergraduate programs in art, architecture, digital media, and film. FIEA was established in 2004 by UCF's  School of Film and Digital Media and industry partners, and accepted its first class of students in Fall of 2005. The site of FIEA was formerly the downtown Expo Centre until late 2004 when the city of Orlando leased the building to the University. The building is now called the UCF Center For Emerging Media.

Programs
FIEA follows a nonstandard educational philosophy which centers on the simulation of a professional video game development environment. The configuration of the building and course work is designed to reinforce this approach. Team-based work combining the efforts of students from the school's three primary disciplines of art, programming, and production is encouraged at all times. A capstone video game creation project for each class of students forms the focus of the second and third semesters of work, comprising pre-production and production phases, respectively.

FIEA's first class of twelve students graduated in December 2006. It has now graduated more than 537 students who have been hired by more than 135 companies worldwide. Recent graduates have accepted jobs at Zynga, Sony, Electronic Arts, Google, YouTube, Bethesda, BioWare, Telltale Games, and many others.

Notable Achievements
Games developed at FIEA:
 Class of December '06 - "Cohort 1"
 The Blob
 Class of May '07 - "Cohort 2"
 Opera Slinger - Independent Games Festival Student Showcase Winner, 2007.
 Danger Zone
 Class of December '07 - "Cohort 3"
 Master Plan
 Class of December '08 - "Cohort 4"
 BizarreCraft
 Zephyr: Tides of War
 Class of December '09 - "Cohort 5"
 Sultans of Scratch
 Drifters
 Class of December '10 - "Cohort 6"
 Shadows of Abigail
 9 Lives 'Til Midnight
 Eclipse
 Class of December '11 - "Cohort 7"
 Nexus
 Scarfell
 Dead West
 Class of December '12 - "Cohort 8"
 Plushy Knight
 Penned
 Battle Fortress Tortoise
 Class of December '13 - "Cohort 9"
 Escherreal
 Grapple
 Pitch Jumper
 Warp Derby
 Class of December '14 - "Cohort 10"
 HIT
 Focal Length
 Neon Night Riders
 Class of December '15 - "Cohort 11"
 Junkers
 Lanterns
 Life Unfolds
 Mall Cop
 Totem
 Class of December '16 - "Cohort 12"
 Child No More
 Ley Lines
 Sketch Artist
 The Channeler
 Class of December '17 - "Cohort 13"
 The Draft
 Hollowed
 The Logician
 MasterKey
 Class of December '18 - "Cohort 14"
 Long Arm of the Law
 Scamp: High Hat Havoc
 Hyper Vital
The Great Emu War
 Liminal
 Class of December '19 - "Cohort 15"
 Malediction
 In Harmony
 Drift Light
 Snowfall Village
 Class of December '20 - "Cohort 16"
 Flicker of Hope (Wick)
 Keepers of the Trees
 Izcalli of the Wind
 Kore
Class of December '21 - "Cohort 17"
Peblito - Rock and Roll
Rings of Hell
The Last Spark
Zenko - A Fox's Tale
Class of December '22 - "Cohort 18"
Soul Shard
K3LVN
Drain Runner
Hermea

External links
University of Central Florida
Florida Interactive Entertainment Academy
Center for Emerging Media
Institute for Simulation and Training

References

"Florida Interactive Entertainment Academy Opens in Orlando", The National Center for Simulation, November 8, 2005. Accessed May 30, 2007
"UCF Gets Downtown Digital Media Campus", Florida High Tech Corridor Council, November 2004. Accessed May 30, 2007
Colavecchio-Van Sickler, Shannon. "Gaming for school credit", The St. Petersburg Times, November 19, 2006. Accessed May 30, 2007
Binette, Chad. "First Florida Interactive Entertainment Academy Class Graduates", UCF News and Information, December 12, 2006. Accessed May 30, 2007

Universities and colleges in Orlando, Florida
Video game universities
University of Central Florida
Educational institutions established in 2004
2004 establishments in Florida